is a railway station located in the city of  Gifu,  Gifu Prefecture,  Japan, operated by the private railway operator Meitetsu.

Lines

Station layout

Takadabashi Station has two ground-level opposed side platforms. The station is unattended.

Platforms

Adjacent stations

History
Takadabashi Station opened on January 21, 1926.

Surrounding area
Nakasendō
Sakai River

See also
 List of Railway Stations in Japan

External links

  

Railway stations in Japan opened in 1926
Stations of Nagoya Railroad
Railway stations in Gifu Prefecture